The Presbytery of Glasgow is one of the 46 Presbyteries of the Church of Scotland. It dates back to the earliest periods of Presbyterian church government in the Church of Scotland in the late 16th century. The Presbytery of Glasgow currently has 125 congregations, making it by far the largest Presbytery in the Church of Scotland.

Congregations vary in location from suburbs and urban priority areas (representing part of the poorest 5% of Scotland’s population) to outlying towns and villages.  The Presbytery boundaries extend beyond the City of Glasgow to include parts of four other local authority areas (East Dunbartonshire, East Renfrewshire, North Lanarkshire and South Lanarkshire).

Presbyterianism
As a Presbyterian church, the Church of Scotland has no bishops. Instead courts of ministers, elders and deacons have collective responsibility for the governance of the church. The Presbytery is the intermediate court of the church, subject to the General Assembly and responsible for the oversight of Kirk Sessions (at a congregational level.) As with all courts of the Church, the Presbytery is chaired by an annually elected Moderator.

Moderator of the Presbytery
Each year Presbytery nominates a Moderator to serve for one year. The Moderator begins their term in June, and represents the Presbytery at church, ecumenical, inter-denominational and civic events, among others. In 2003-2004, the Rev. Adah Younger (minister at Dennistoun Central Parish Church) became the first woman to be Moderator of the Presbytery.

Presbytery meetings
The Presbytery meets each month (except January, July and August). Twice a year, smaller regional meetings are held covering a number of topics.   All meeting dates, times and venues are advertised on the Presbytery website (www.presbyteryofglasgow.org.uk).

Presbytery structure
The Presbytery is based around a committee structure made up of:  Community Responsibility; Ecumenical Relations & Interfaith Matters; Education; Learning & Nurture; Ministry; Mission; Nominations; Property; Staffing; Stewardship & Finance; Strategic Planning; Superintendence (including Safeguarding); World Mission; and Worship.

Presbytery Clerk
The Presbytery Clerk is Rev. George S. Cowie, formerly parish Minister at South Holburn in Aberdeen Presbytery , who also serves as a Chaplain in Ordinary to Her Majesty the Queen. Previous Presbytery Clerks include Very Rev. Bill Hewitt (Moderator of the General Assembly of the Church of Scotland 2009-2010), Rev. Dr Graham Blount, Rev. Dr Angus Kerr, and Very Rev. Dr David Lunan, (Moderator of the General Assembly of the Church of Scotland 2008-2009).

The Presbytery Office is located in Glasgow city centre within the Renfield Centre, attached to St Andrew’s West Church, at 260 Bath Street, G2 4JP.

See also
Govan Old Parish Church - no longer used for regular worship
List of Church of Scotland parishes
Norman Shanks - a former Presbytery Moderator
Presbytery of Aberdeen (Church of Scotland)
Presbytery of Europe (Church of Scotland)

Other denominations 

Diocese of Glasgow and Galloway (in the Scottish Episcopal Church)
Roman Catholic Archdiocese of Glasgow

References

External links

Glasgow Churches Together
The Independent: Obituary of the Very Rev Andrew Herron, Presbytery Clerk 1959-1981

Christianity in Glasgow
Glasgow
Calvinist organizations established in the 16th century
16th-century establishments in Scotland